Marvel Loch is a small townsite of fewer than 100 people,  east of Perth, Western Australia. The town is located in the Shire of Yilgarn.

Gold was discovered in the area in the early 1890s. In 1906 following gold mining leases being issued to Markham, Doolette, Leneberg and Le Breton, who named their lease Marvel Loch.
The town is named after the horse that won the Caulfield Cup in 1905.
The town lies between the mine and another minesite, and the current location was surveyed in 1909 and the town was gazetted in 1911. The Marvel Loch Progress Association was formed in 1909 to help get a School established in the area, which was built by the Association in around 1910 out of Lime Wash Hession Walls with Bush Poles and an Iron Roof. In 1911 with attendance growing resulted in a bigger building being built in 1911.

Tianye SXO Gold Mining currently operate the Marvel Loch Gold Mine in Marvel Loch, and have a gold processing plant located near the town to process ore from their surrounding mines, Nevoria and Aquarius. The plant is projected to produce 200,000 ounces of gold in 2015.

The surrounding areas produce some wheat and other cereal crops. The town is a receival site for Cooperative Bulk Handling.

References 

Towns in Western Australia
Mining towns in Western Australia
Grain receival points of Western Australia
Shire of Yilgarn